Aurelia is a crater on Venus. It has a large dark surface up range from the crater; lobate flows emanating from crater ejecta, and very radar-bright ejecta and floor.  The crater takes its name from Aurelia.

References

Impact craters on Venus